Zastal Zielona Góra, officially  Enea Zastal BC Zielona Góra for sponsorship reasons, is a Polish professional basketball team that is based in Zielona Góra, Poland. The team plays in the Polish League and internationally in the VTB United League. For past club sponsorship names, see the list below.

History
The club was founded in the year 1946 under the name KS Zieloni, and in the following years the club had several name changes. Some of the names the team had included Stal Zielona Góra, Wagmo Zielona Góra and Lechia Zielona Góra. In the early 1960s the team consistently played in the third tier of Poland as Lechia. In the 1966–67 season, the club promoted to the second tier I Liga for the first time. In 1968 the team adopted the still famous club name Zastal Zielona Góra.

In the 1983–84 season, Zastal promoted to the top tier Polish Basketball League for the first time in club history. The club stayed there for a long time, however they had to leave the league in the 1999–2000 season due to financial problems. These problems caused Zastal to fall back all the way to the III Liga. In June 2001, Sports Joint Stock Company Grono became the owner of the team and a season later the club returned to the second tier I Liga.

In the 2009–10 season, Zastal finished in second place in the I Liga and was promoted back to the PLK. The golden years for the club would begin here. In the 2011–12 season, the team finished in third place in the Polish League. Due to sponsorship reasons, in the summer of 2012, the club changed its name from Zastal Zielona Góra to Stelmet Zielona Góra. In the 2012-13 season, the club won the Polish League championship, and thus qualified to play in the 2013–14 EuroLeague season, the highest continental level. The following years the club would consistently compete for the Polish national title while also playing in Europe.

On 24 February 2022 Zielona Góra terminated their membership with VTB United League due to Russian war against Ukraine.

Sponsorship naming
The club has had several denominations through the years due to its sponsorship:
 Wagmo Zielona Góra (1946–1949)
 Stal Zielona Góra (1950–1954)
 Zastal Zielona Góra (1955–1956, 1969–1992, 1995–1998, 2005–2007, 2008–2012)
 Lechia Zielona Góra (1957–1968)
 Zastal-Fortum Zielona Góra (1992–1995)
 Zastal-Dallas Zielona Góra (1998–1999)
 Zastal-Karl Eppe Zielona Góra (1999–2000)
 Intermarche-Zastal Zielona Góra (2000–2005)
 Wiecko-Zastal Zielona Góra (2007–2008)
 Stelmet Zielona Góra (2012–2018)
 Stelmet Enea Zielona Góra (2018–2020)
 Enea Zastal BC Zielona Góra (2020–present)

Logos

Achievements
Polish League
Champions (5): 2012–13, 2014–15, 2015–16, 2016–17, 2019–20
Runner-up (2): 2013–14, 2020–21
Bronze (1): 2011–12
 Polish Cup
Champions (3): 2015, 2017, 2021
Polish Supercup 
Champions (3): 2015, 2020, 2021

Other achievements
Gliwice, Poland Invitational Game
 Winners (1): 2015

Season by season 

Through 2013–14 season, Stelmet Zielona Góra had played 18 seasons in the top Polish League (official name: Polska Liga Koszykówki). Altogether, through the 2013–14 season, the club had won 278 league games, and lost 343 league games.

Players

Retired numbers

Current roster

Notable players

References

External links
  
 
 
 Stelmet Zielona Góra at Euroleague.net

Basketball teams established in 1946
Basketball teams in Poland
Sport in Zielona Góra
1946 establishments in Poland